Valderrama may refer to:

People
 Valderrama (surname)

Places
 Valderrama, Antique, a municipality in the Philippines

Other uses
Valderrama Golf Club in Spain.
Balderrama, the name of a zamba by Castilla and Leguizamón, which appears, interpreted by Mercedes Sosa, in the soundtrack of the second part of the Che film.